Arthur Dawson (1882–1951) was an English all-round sportsman. He played professional association football as a winger for Blackburn Rovers, and played amateur cricket in the Lancashire League.

Arthur Dawson batted for Rishton from 1901 to 1912, and opened for East Lancs. between 1913 and 1921. On many occasions he was batting opposite Victor Norbury, and one of their partnerships became an East Lancs. record not bettered until the 1960s. Both players featured strongly in the 1919 League win, scoring over 45% of the total runs between them in roughly equal measure.

References

1882 births
1951 deaths
People from Rishton
English footballers
Association football wingers
Blackburn Rovers F.C. players
Nelson F.C. players
Burnley F.C. players
English Football League players